Mohed Altrad is a French-Syrian billionaire businessman, rugby chairman and writer, born c. March 1948. He was born to a very young mother and his Bedouin father gave him away to his grandparents at age four following his mother's death. In 2015, Altrad was named Ernst & Young World Entrepreneur Of The Year.

Background
Mohed Altrad spent part of his youth in Raqqa, Syria. He passed the baccalaureate at 17, and thanks to his high scores, was awarded a scholarship of 200 francs from the Syrian government to study in France. He obtained a diploma from Paris Dauphine University (MIAGE 1975).
He is unsure of his day of birth, so he recently "picked a date from a hat" in order to celebrate one.

Career
Altrad began working for the Abu Dhabi National Oil Company, from which he left to buy a scaffolding company in France in 1985. This acquisition morphed into the present-day Altrad Group, employer of over 22,000 people, and involved in the scaffolding and cement-mixing industries. Altrad remains chairman of his namesake company, as well as the rugby club Montpellier Hérault Rugby. He has also penned three acclaimed novels.

In December 2022, Altrad received an 18-months suspended sentence and a €50,000 fine after he and French Rugby Federation president Bernard Laporte were found guilty of corruption relating to Altrad Group rugby shirt sponsorship deals.

Bibliography

Novels
 Badawi (Actes Sud), 2002
 L’hypothèse de Dieu (Actes Sud), 2006
 La Promesse d’Annah (Actes Sud), 2012

Essays
 Stratégie de groupe (Chotard), 1990.
 Écouter, Harmoniser, Diriger (Presses de la Cité) 1992.
 Le management d’un groupe international : vers la pensée multiple (Eska) with Carole Richard, 2008.

References

External links 
 (rus) Его готовили в пастухи, а он тайком сбегал в школу. История сирийского бедуина, ставшего французским миллиардером

1948 births
Living people
French people of Syrian descent
French rugby union chairmen and investors
French billionaires
Syrian billionaires
Montpellier Hérault Rugby
University of Montpellier alumni
Paris Dauphine University alumni
Syrian businesspeople